Rosa 'Fragrant Cloud',  (aka TANellis ), is a hybrid tea rose cultivar, bred by Mathias Tantau, Jr. in Germany in 1963. The plant was created from stock parents, Rosa 'Prima Ballerina' and  Rosa 'Monteauma'. 'Fragrant Cloud' has won multiple awards, including the Portland Gold Medal in 1966, the James Gamble Fragrance award in 1970, and induction into the Rose Hall of Fame as "World's Favourite Rose" in 1981.

Description
'Fragrant Cloud' is a medium-tall, upright shrub, 3 to 7 ft (91–152 cm) in height with a 3 to 4 ft (90–121 cm) spread. Blooms are very large,6 in (15 cm) in diameter, with a high centered, full bloom form with 26 to 40 petals. Flowers are borne singly on short stems or in small clusters of 3–7. The flowers are a bright orange-coral, and take on an unusual purplish hue as they mature. The rose has a strong, citrus, damask fragrance; large, dark green foliage; and is very prickly.  Fragrant Cloud' blooms in flushes throughout its growing season. The plant does well in USDA zone 7 and warmer.

Child plants
'Fragrant Cloud' was used to hybridize the following plants:

 Rosa 'Alec's Red' 
 Rosa 'Bengal Tiger' 
 Rosa 'Boogie Woogie' 
 Rosa 'Folklore'
 Rosa 'Forgotten Dreams' 
 Rosa 'Friendship' 
 Rosa 'Gitte
 Rosa 'Harmonie' 
  Rosa 'Just Joey' 
 Rosa 'Kleopatra' 
 Rosa 'Rose Rhapsody' 
 Rosa 'Tenerife' 
 Rosa 'Typhoo Tea'
 Rosa 'Velvet Fragrance'

Awards 
 Royal National Rose Society (RNRS), President's International Trophy (PIT), (1964)
 Portland Gold Medal, (1966)
 James Gamble Fragrance award, (1970)
 Rose Hall of Fame, (1981)

See also
Garden roses
All-America Rose Selections
List of Award of Garden Merit roses

Notes

References

Fragrant Cloud

fr:Nuage Parfumé